Kim Gwan-gyu (born 15 March 1967) is a South Korean speed skater. He competed in three events at the 1988 Winter Olympics.

References

1967 births
Living people
South Korean male speed skaters
Olympic speed skaters of South Korea
Speed skaters at the 1988 Winter Olympics
Place of birth missing (living people)
Speed skaters at the 1986 Asian Winter Games